Digital Signal Processing is a monthly peer-reviewed open access scientific journal covering all areas of signal processing. It as established in 1991 and published by Academic Press, now Elsevier. The editor-in-chief is Ercan E. Kuruoglu (ISTI-CNR, Pisa, Italy).

Abstracting and indexing 
The journal is abstracted and indexed in:
 Current Contents/Engineering, Computing & Technology
 Engineering Index Monthly
 EBSCOhost
 INSPEC
 Science Citation Index
 Scopus
According to the Journal Citation Reports, the journal has a 2014 impact factor of 1.495.

References

External links

Digital signal processing
English-language journals
Electrical and electronic engineering journals
Open access journals
Monthly journals
Publications established in 1991